The 1939 Individual Speedway World Championship was cancelled due to the outbreak of World War II. It would have been the fourth edition of the official World Championship to determine the world champion rider.

Semi-final results

References

1939
Individual World Championship
Individual Speedway World Championship
Individual Speedway World Championship